Copparo is a town and comune of Emilia Romagna, Italy, in the Province of Ferrara, located  northeast of the regional capital of Bologna and  east of the provincial capital of Ferrara, Copparo sits in the fertile Po River Delta— south of the river and  from the Adriatic coast.

Demographics

History
The origins of Copparo date back to the early Middle Ages and are confirmed both by a formation prior to the year 1000 and by its belonging to the Church of Ferrara and Ravenna (955) under the name "Massa in Copario".
From many historical documents it appears that Copparo was a rather large agricultural center within the territory of Ferrara. The 1431 census mentions it as the largest area sown with barley and wheat. Copparo was likewise mentioned in the Statuta Ferrariae dated 1287 under the name of "Coparius" (recalling the responsibility the citizens of Copparo had in digging the"de preta" channel). After the year 1251, the area fell under the title of the Dukes of Ferrara, the Estensi family. They used the area primarily for recreational purposes, developing one of their principle game preserves and hunting lodges, a turreted castle. It was destroyed during the war against Venice and rebuilt in 1540. It then became one of the most famous Estense Delights. Of the original structure and its five towers only a solitary one remains today, on the site of the current city hall.

Cuisine
Copparo's cuisine has both simple and sophisticated dishes, being a combination of the tastes of the Estense's noble cuisine and the farmers' traditional cuisine. 
It includes main courses such as "pasticcio di maccheroni" or the popular cappelletti and lasagne all made with fresh egg pasta.  The ancient Ferrara bread, the renaissance “ciupèta", is widely available throughout the town, still prepared with the old recipe and protected as a European mark “IGP", with its unique and strange shape that recall in the same time the male and the female symbols.

Famous companies
There are 313 industrial firms employing 3.947 people that are the 55,19% of the total of the workers. There are 384 service firms employing 1.044 people that are the 14,60% of the total of the workers. There are also 385 firms employing 1.515 people that are the 21,18% of the total of the workers. There are also 104 administrative offices employing 646 workers that are the 9,03% of the total of the workers.

The most important factory in the area is Berco Spa, a manufacturer of considerable size specialised in the production of tracked vehicle components, equipment for overhauling the undercarriages of earth moving machinery and manufacture of machine tools for the reconditioning of internal combustion engines.

Notable people
Daniele Barioni
Livio Pavanelli

References

External links

 - Official site of the "Comune di Copparo"
De Micheli Theatre

Cities and towns in Emilia-Romagna